Piwen Karkar (born 1995) is an international Papua New Guinea lawn bowler.

Bowls career

Commonwealth Games
Karkar represented Papua New Guinea in the triples and fours at the 2018 Commonwealth Games.

World Championships
In 2020 she was selected for the 2020 World Outdoor Bowls Championship in Australia.

Asia Pacific
Piwen won a silver medal in the pairs with Catherine Wimp at 2019 Asia Pacific Bowls Championships in the Gold Coast, Queensland.

References

Living people
Bowls players at the 2018 Commonwealth Games
Papua New Guinean female bowls players
1995 births
Commonwealth Games competitors for Papua New Guinea